The Battle of Cusco was fought in November 1533 between the forces of Spanish Conquistadors and of the Incas.

The Battle 
After executing the Inca Atahualpa in 26 July 1533, Francisco Pizarro marched his forces to Cusco, the capital of the Incan Empire. As the Spanish army approached Cusco, however, Pizarro sent his brother Juan Pizarro and Hernando de Soto ahead with forty men. The advance guard fought a pitched battle with Incan troops in front of the city, securing victory. The Incan army under the command of Quizquiz withdrew during the night.

The next day, 15 November 1533, Pizarro entered Cusco, accompanied by Manco Inca Yupanqui, a young Inca prince who had survived the massacre that Quizquiz had done to the nobility in Cusco. The Spanish plundered Cusco, where they found much gold and silver. Manco was crowned as Sapa Inca and helped Pizarro to drive Quizquiz back to the North.

Two years later, Quizquiz was killed, after being struck down by his own followers, leaving none to lead the Inca Empire, since his only equal commander, Chalkuchimac, had been burned in captivity. Three years later Manco Inca Yupanqui fled from Cusco and tried to recapture the city with some 100,000 Incas, but ultimately failed after a ten-month siege.

References 

Cuzco
Cuzco
Cuzco
Cuzco
History of Cusco Region
1533 in the Inca civilization
16th century in Peru
1533 in the Spanish Empire